Deanii Andrea Scott (pronounced  ; born October 3, 1990), known professionally as Scottie Beam, is an American media personality and model. She is best known as a former producer at Hot 97, where she worked for ten years, and as a former co-host on State of the Culture. She currently co-hosts the podcasts Black Girl Podcast and Okay, Now Listen.

Early life
Deanii Scott was born and raised in the Bronx, New York. Her mother, Shaila Scott, has been a DJ for 107.5 WBLS for decades.

Career
Scottie Beam began her radio career first working for KISS FM's street team, and then at Hot 97. She attended Clark Atlanta University but soon dropped out and returned to New York to pursue a career in music.

Scottie worked as digital producer for Columbia Records and then returned to Hot 97 to produce first for Angie Martinez and then for Ebro in the Morning. After ten years at Hot 97, she then took a role as co-host for Revolt TV's State of the Culture and left in 2019.

She has worked as a model for brands such as Nike, Foot Locker, and The North Face. She has spoken on issues related to black women, such as colorism.

In 2017, Scottie began co-hosting a podcast with four other women (Rebecca "Bex" Francois, Sapphira Martin, Alysha Pamphile, and Gia Peppers), all of whom used to work for Hot 97. Black Girl Podcast focuses on pop culture and issues relevant to young women in the professional world.

In July 2017, she tweeted about being physically attacked by a security guard at Queen's Knockdown Center.

She hosted the 2019 Netflix special Rhythm + Flow:The Aftershow.

In April 2020, it was announced that Scottie would co-host a bi-weekly podcast with BuzzFeed journalist Sylvia Obell called Okay, Now Listen, sponsored by Netflix's Strong Black Lead initiative. The podcast is described as "two Black women discuss[ing] what they're dealing with at any given moment — from belting out gospel to speaking candidly about sex — with a firmly Black cultural frame of reference." The podcast is produced in conjunction with Pineapple Street Studios.

Awards and nominations 

 2022 – Nominee, Webby Award for Culture & Lifestyle Campaigns (for Get You A Me)

Filmography

References

External links 
Scottie Beam on Instagram

Get You A Me on YouTube

Living people
American DJs
American media personalities
Entertainers from the Bronx
Female models from New York (state)
American women DJs
African-American female models
American podcasters
American women podcasters
1990 births
African-American women musicians
21st-century African-American people
21st-century African-American women